The 1950–51 Duke Blue Devils men's basketball team represented Duke University during the 1950–51 men's college basketball season. The head coach was Harold Bradley, coaching his first season with the Blue Devils. The team finished with an overall record of 20–13.

References 

Duke Blue Devils men's basketball seasons
Duke
1950 in sports in North Carolina
1951 in sports in North Carolina